Esfandiar (Esfandiyār), also transliterated as Esfandyar, Isfandiyor, Isfandiar, Isfandiyar or Esfandiar, is a common Persian given name and may refer to the following:

Esfandiyār, the legendary Iranian hero
Esfandiar Ahmadieh, Iranian animation filmmaker
Esfandiar Baharmast, American soccer referee
Esfandiar Monfaredzadeh, Iranian composer
Esfandiar Rahim Mashaei, Iranian politician
Esfandiar Ekhtiyari, Zoroastrian Iranian politician
Esfandiar Zarnegar, Iranian fencer
Isfandiyar Khan Beg, Mughal faujdar of Sylhet Sarkar
Kulu Isfandiyar, Sarbadar

See also
Esfandiari (disambiguation)

Persian masculine given names